Will Orben (born March 30, 1974) is an American former professional soccer player who played as a striker. He is currently head coach of Phillips Academy.

Career
After playing for the Hershey Wildcats, Orben played in Denmark for FC Copenhagen, Viborg FF, Ølstykke FC, B.93 and BK Skjold.

After retiring as a player, Orben became a coach, and was in charge of Taft School starting in 2003. He is now head coach at Phillips Andover Academy.

References

1974 births
Living people
Association football forwards
American soccer players
American soccer coaches
American expatriate soccer players
Expatriate men's footballers in Denmark